The Green World ATP Challenger is a tennis tournament held in Pingguo, China since 2011. The event is part of the ATP Challenger Tour and is played on hard courts.

Past finals

Singles

Doubles

References

External links

 
ATP Challenger Tour
Tennis tournaments in China
Hard court tennis tournaments